Bulbophyllum caecilii is a species of orchid in the genus Bulbophyllum. Its more common name is "Caecil's Bulbophyllum."

References
The Bulbophyllum-Checklist
The Internet Orchid Species Photo Encyclopedia

caecilii